Villa Aroma Airport  is a high-elevation airport serving the town of Sica Sica in the La Paz Department of Bolivia. The town and airport are on the eastern side of the Bolivian Altiplano.

See also

Transport in Bolivia
List of airports in Bolivia

References

External links 
OpenStreetMap - Villa Aroma
OurAirports - Villa Aroma
Fallingrain - Villa Aroma Airport

Airports in La Paz Department (Bolivia)